Taylor Airport may refer to:

 Taylor Airport (Alaska) in Taylor, Alaska, United States (FAA: AK49, IATA: TWE)
 Taylor Airport (Arizona) in Taylor, Arizona, United States (FAA: TYL)
 Taylor Airport (Albany, Texas) in Albany, Texas, United States (FAA: 6F5)
 Taylor Airport (Quinlan, Texas) in Quinlan, Texas, United States (FAA: T14)
 Taylor Municipal Airport in Taylor, Texas, United States (FAA: T74)

See also
 Taylor Field (disambiguation)
 Taylor County Airport (disambiguation)